Royal Air Force Woodbridge or RAF Woodbridge, is a former Royal Air Force station located east of Woodbridge in the county of Suffolk, England.

Constructed in 1943 as a Royal Air Force (RAF) military airfield during the Second World War to assist damaged aircraft to land on their return from raids over Germany it was later used by the United States Air Force during the Cold War, being the primary home for the 79th and 78th Tactical Fighter Squadrons and squadrons of the 81st Fighter Wing under various designations until 1993.  For many years, the 81st also operated from nearby RAF Bentwaters, with Bentwaters and Woodbridge being known as the "Twin Bases".

Since 2006, it has been known as MOD Woodbridge, incorporating Woodbridge Airfield and Rock Barracks. Woodbridge Airfield is used by Army Air Corps aircraft for training and Rock Barracks are home to the newly formed 23 Engineer Regiment (Air Assault) of the Royal Engineers.

History

Second World War

In 1943, Woodbridge was constructed in the south-east as one of three airfields set up to accept distressed aircraft returning from raids over Germany, and was therefore fitted with extra-long, heavy-duty runways (the other two being at RAF Manston in Kent and RAF Carnaby in Yorkshire).
These airfields were intended for use by returning bombers suffering from low-fuel and suspected damage to their pneumatic (wheel brake) and/or hydraulic (undercarriage lowering) systems. All three airfields were equipped with a single runway, 9,000 ft (2,700 m) long and 750 ft (230 m) wide. (5 times the normal width) There was a further clear area of 1,500 ft (460 m) at each end of the runway.  At each of the three airfields, the runway was divided into three 250 ft (76 m) lanes. The northern and central lanes were allocated by flying control, while the southern lane was the emergency lane on which any aircraft could land without first making contact with the airfield.
It was initially called RAF Sutton Heath.
The site at Woodbridge was chosen as it was 'nearly fog-free and had no obstructions for miles', although more than a million trees had to be cleared from Rendlesham Forest to take the new base. Its first use, however was in July 1943, when it was used by a Boeing B-17 Flying Fortress bomber of the United States Army Air Forces.

In the spring of 1944, Woodbridge was considered to be the operational base for Operation Aphrodite, a secret plan for drone B-17's (designated as BQ-7s), to be used against German V-1 flying bomb sites, submarine pens, or deep fortifications that had resisted conventional bombing. In early July, several B-17s, modified into BQ-7 drones, from the 562d Bomb Squadron of the 388th Bomb Group arrived at Woodbridge.  The aircraft were stripped of all interior equipment and armament and packed with explosives.  The plane would be flown by a human pilot, then handed over to radio control via a primitive television system, at which point the pilot parachuted out just before the English Channel came in sight. Another B-17 would act as a 'mother' ship, guiding the drone across the channel to its target.

No Aphrodite mission was ever flown from Woodbridge because, after one aborted attempt, the unit moved up to RAF Fersfield, near Diss, Norfolk.

On 13 July 1944, a Luftwaffe Ju 88 G-1 night fighter of 7 Staffel/NJG 2, bearing aircraft code 4R+UR, on North Sea night patrol landed at Woodbridge.  This aircraft carried recent versions of the FuG 220 Lichtenstein SN-2 radar, Naxos-Z and FuG 227 Flensburg homer which were being successfully used to intercept RAF bombers.  The German crew had only just completed 100 hours of flight training, and had flown by compass heading, but had proceeded in exactly the wrong direction and thought they were over their own airfield.  Within days, the Royal Aircraft Establishment (RAE) had analysed the radar equipment and devised countermeasures.

Fuel was transported to Melton railway station before being piped to the airfield.

By the end of the Second World War 4,200 aircraft had made emergency landings at RAF Woodbridge. After the war the airfield was used for some experimental work by the RAF with Avro Lancasters being based there, dropping Grand Slam bombs on Orford Ness, and the Blind Landing Experimental Unit (BLEU) was located at Woodbridge. Eventually it was closed on 14 March 1948 and put into 'care and maintenance' status.

Cold War

79th Fighter Squadron

As a result of the Cold War United States Air Force (USAF) buildup in Europe, Woodbridge was made available to the Americans by the Air Ministry in early 1952.  Expansion of the facility to bring it up to NATO standards commenced on 16 April 1952, with the establishment of the 3928th Air Base Squadron.

The first operational USAF unit to reside at Woodbridge was the 79th Fighter-Bomber Squadron which arrived on 1 October 1952.  The 79th TFS was a component of the 20th Fighter-Bomber Wing based at RAF Wethersfield.  Restricted space at Wethersfield compelled the 79th Squadron to move initially to RAF Bentwaters on 6 June, then to Woodbridge, three miles southwest of Bentwaters, on 1 October.

The 79th FBS flew the Republic F-84G Thunderjet.  Markings for the F-84s at Woodbridge consisted of yellow lightning flashes on the fuselage and on the external wing tip tanks.

The mission of the 79th was to provide escort for Strategic Air Command (SAC) Boeing B-47 Stratojet rotational deployments from RAF Sturgate.  These deployments generally involved about 45 aircraft, together with about twenty Boeing KC-97 Stratofreighters, which were maintained at English bases for 90 days.  At the end of the Temporary Duty (TDY), they were relieved by another SAC wing that was generally stationed at a different airfield.  These missions continued until 1964.

In 1955, the 79th was upgraded to the swept-wing F-84F Thunderstreak, with the older "G" models being transferred to other NATO countries or to the Middle East.  Lightning flashes were not painted on the "F" models, but the yellow squadron colour band around the extreme rear of the fuselage remained a squadron marking.  The 79th flew the F-84F only until 1958, when the 20th was redesignated a tactical fighter wing, and the squadron was re-equipped with the North American F-100 Super Sabre.  The 79th TFS was transferred to RAF Upper Heyford during January 1970 when Wethersfield was closed and the 20th TFW was reassigned.

It has been reported that the U.S. stored nuclear missiles at this site without the UK public knowing and that it was also the scene of a UFO sighting in 1980.

Twin Base with RAF Bentwaters

Beginning on 8 July 1958, Woodbridge was operated as "twin base" (twin airfield) with RAF Bentwaters, and as a single unit with Bentwaters under the 81st Tactical Fighter Wing.  Along with the 79th from the 20th TFW, the 78th Fighter-Interceptor Squadron operated from the station, being transferred from RAF Shepherds Grove when the USAF turned Shepherds Grove over to the Air Ministry.

Initially flying F-84F Thunderstreaks, in December they were replaced by the McDonnell F-101A/C Voodoo, and redesignated as a Tactical Fighter Squadron.  Markings of the 78th TFS were a red tail with silver star pattern design on the vertical stabilizer.

In November 1965, the 78th TFS received McDonnell F-4C Phantom IIs to replace the Voodoos, with red fin caps as their squadron marking. In October 1969 the F-4C aircraft were replaced with the F-4D.  In February 1970, the 81st adapted tail codes, with "WR" being used by the 78th.

In 1972, construction began on Woodbridge American High School and classes began in 1973.

With the arrival of the Fairchild Republic A-10 Thunderbolt II in USAFE in 1979, the 81st TFW was expanded to six squadrons.  Three of these were stationed at Woodbridge.

It was decided to expand the 81st with six A-10 squadrons distributed over both Woodbridge and Bentwaters as follows:
 78th Tactical Fighter(Received A-10s 3 June 1979)
 91st Tactical Fighter(Received A-10s 24 August 1979)
 509th Tactical Fighter (Activated 1 Oct 1979) (Grey tail stripe)(Received A-10s 1 October 1979)

All the A-10 squadrons were tail-coded "WR".

The 91st was transferred to Woodbridge from Bentwaters on 1 February 1980.  The 509th was reactivated as an A-10 squadron, previously being an F-102 unit at Clark Air Base, Philippines.

At Woodbridge, USAFE activated the 509th Tactical Fighter Squadron.  The 509th was previously an F-102 squadron at and the 91st was moved to Woodbridge from Bentwaters.  On 1 June 1988, the 509th was transferred to RAF Alconbury when the 10th transitioned from a Tactical Reconnaissance to a Tactical Fighter Squadron.

67th Air Rescue and Recovery Squadron

The 67th Air Rescue and Recovery Squadron (ARRS) moved to RAF Woodbridge from Morón Air Base, Spain, on 15 January 1970.  The 67th ARRS operated Lockheed HC-130H/N/P Hercules fixed wing aircraft, and heavy duty HH-53 Jolly Green Giant helicopters, and was assigned an air rescue and special operations mission.  The 67th ARRS participated in the rescue efforts of the capsized Townsend Thoresen ferry Herald of Free Enterprise outside of Zeebrugge Harbour on 6 March 1987. On 1 June 1988, they were redesignated the 39th Special Operations Wing. On 1 April 1992 they moved to RAF Alconbury as part of the closure of RAF Woodbridge.

Deactivation – 1990s
With the end of the Cold War, the USAF presence at Woodbridge was gradually phased down.  It was announced that the airfield would be closed, and the 81st TFW would be inactivated.  Woodbridge-based squadrons were phased-down as follows:
 78th Tactical Fighter Squadron was inactivated on 1 May 1992.  Its aircraft were sent back to the United States to various Air National Guard squadrons.
 91st Tactical Fighter Squadron was inactivated on 14 August 1992.  Its aircraft were sent back to the United States to various Air National Guard squadrons.

The last A-10 aircraft departed Woodbridge on 14 August 1993, and the airfield was closed as a US military facility.  The 81st Tactical Fighter Wing was inactivated on 1 July 1993.  With the inactivation, the USAF returned control of Woodbridge to the UK Ministry of Defence (The 81st was reactivated as the 81st Training Wing at Keesler Air Force Base, Mississippi on 1 July 1993).

Current use
On 1 September 2006, RAF Woodbridge became Ministry of Defence (MOD) Woodbridge. The site is operated by the British Army and incorporates both Rock Barracks and Woodbridge Airfield.

The airfield is used by Army Air Corps aircraft for training and Rock Barracks are home to the newly formed 23 Engineer Regiment (Air Assault) of the Royal Engineers. The airfield is also regularly used to host track days, managed by companies such as Javelin Track Days.

During August 2016 the runway was used for testing the Airbus A400M Atlas.

In November 2016 the Ministry of Defence announced that the site would close by 2027.

On 28 February 2019, defence minister Tobias Ellwood announces that MOD Woodbridge (Rock Barracks) would remain open, altering previous closure plans.

In popular culture
RAF Woodbridge features as a setting in the 2017 video game Bomber Crew.

See also
 List of former Royal Air Force stations
 United States Air Forces in Europe
 United States Air Force in the United Kingdom
 RAF Bentwaters
 Rendlesham Forest Incident

References

Citations

Bibliography
 Ravenstein, Charles A. (1984). Air Force Combat Wings Lineage and Honors Histories 1947-1977. Maxwell AFB, Alabama: Office of Air Force History. .
 Endicott, Judy G. (1999) Active Air Force wings as of 1 October 1995; USAF active flying, space, and missile squadrons as of 1 October 1995. Maxwell AFB, Alabama: Office of Air Force History. CD-ROM
 Menard, David W. (1998) Before Centuries: USAFE Fighters, 1948-1959. Howell Press Inc. 
 Martin, Patrick (1994). Tail Code: The Complete History of USAF Tactical Aircraft Tail Code Markings. Schiffer Military Aviation History. .
 Rogers, Brian (2005). United States Air Force Unit Designations Since 1978. Hinkley, England: Midland Publications. .
 USAAS-USAAC-USAAF-USAF Aircraft Serial Numbers--1908 to Present

External links

 RAF Woodbridge Oct 2006 
  Woodbridge history from Bentwaters Aviation Society
 the UnOfficial 81st SPS RAF Bentwaters/Woodbridge Site  –  the gathering place for the men & women who served in the USAF 81st Security (Air) Police Squadron at RAF Woodbridge and RAF Bentwaters
 An RAF air photograph of the Woodbridge ELG showing the much larger runway than at RAF Bentwaters'

Royal Air Force stations in Suffolk
Army Air Corps airfields
Military installations established in 2006